Narega Day . He works for the Mazdoor Kisan Shakti Sangathan (Mazdoor Kishan Shakti Sangthan), Suchna Evum Rozgar Adhikar Abhiyan and NCPRI (National Campaign for People's Right to Information). He has been actively working for Right to Information, Mahatma Gandhi National Rural Employment Guarantee Act, Lokpal bill and Right to Food and other Human Rights organisations.

Early activities
After working briefly with the Kheduth Mazdoor Chetna Sangathana in Madhya Pradesh, he joined Aruna Roy and Shankar Singh in 1987 to go to Devdungri, in Rajsamand District in Rajasthan where along with many others they helped form and establish the Mazdoor Kisan Shakti Sangathan (MKSS).

Social activist
Since 1990, he has been a full-time worker of the MKSS, and a part of the organisations decision making collective. In this capacity he has been involved in struggles of the poor for justice, including grass root struggles for land and the payment of minimum wages. He has also been a part of the organisations involvement in larger campaigns- most notably for the Peoples Right to Information, and the Right to Work, the Right to Food, and the protection of other human rights guaranteed under the Indian Constitution.
He was called in famous Amir khan TV show Satyamev Jayate for clarifying more about RTI (Right To Information) along with Shankar Sing, Sowmya Kidambi, Aruna Roy

Nikhil Dey also worked with the Government of Rajasthan on its Jana Soochana program, which aimed to implement the 'proactive disclosure' section of the Right to Information Act, by which the government would publish information about its work proactively and obviate any need to file RTI requests.

References

External links
 The Right To No Secrets
 Profile
https://skollworldforum.org/contributor/nikhil-dey/

Activists from Rajasthan
Living people
1963 births